Jan van Roessel (7 April 19253 June 2011) was a Dutch football player.

Club career
A big striker and fierce header of the ball, Van Roessel was picked up at LONGA by local rivals Willem II in Tilburg in 1951, and won the 1952 Dutch (then still amateur) league title and in 1955 the first professional Eredivisie championship.  He formed a potent strike force with Toon Becx and Piet de Jong and was reportedly linked to neighbours PSV Eindhoven and some Italian clubs, most notably Sampdoria and Torino, but Czech coach František Fadrhonc convinced him to stay in Tilburg.

Van Roessel was named Player of the Century of Willem II.

International career
Van Roessel made his debut for the Netherlands in a June 1949 friendly match against Finland and had earned a total of 6 caps, scoring 5 goals. He represented his country at the 1952 Summer Olympics, where he scored against Brazil.

His final international was a May 1955 friendly match against Switzerland.

International goals
Scores and results list Holland's goal tally first.

Personal life and death
Van Roessel married Louisa van Laarhoven in 1956 and the couple had one daughter, who died of leukemia in 1988. In his later years, he suffered from Alzheimer's disease. Van Roessel died on 3 June 2011 of a lung disease at the age of 86.

Honours
Netherlands Football League Championship: 2
 1951–52, 1954–55

References

External links
 
Obituary - Sportkwadraat
Profile - Voetbal Legends 

1925 births
2011 deaths
Footballers from Tilburg
Association football forwards
Dutch footballers
Netherlands international footballers
Footballers at the 1952 Summer Olympics
Olympic footballers of the Netherlands
Willem II (football club) players
Eredivisie players
People with Alzheimer's disease
Respiratory disease deaths in the Netherlands
Deaths from lung disease